Kokunye Kyun is an island in the Andaman Sea, right off the coast of Mon State, in the southern area of Burma. It is located in an area of shoals.

Geography
Kokunye Kyun is the northernmost of a chain of small coastal islands that lie close to the mouth of the Ye River.

See also
List of islands of Burma

References 

Mon State
Islands of Myanmar